Giovanni Korte (born August 1, 1993) is a Dutch professional footballer who plays as a winger for De Graafschap in the Eerste Divisie.

Career
Korte began his career with ADO Den Haag and made his professional debut on 12 May 2013 in a 4–2 defeat against PEC Zwolle. He was sent on loan at FC Dordrecht for the 2013–14 season. After his contract with ADO had not been extended, Korte signed a three-year deal with NAC Breda in June 2016. In 2019, he signed with SC Cambuur.

On 29 June 2021, he signed a two-year contract with De Graafschap.

References

External links
 
 
 

1993 births
Living people
Footballers from The Hague
Association football wingers
Dutch footballers
Eredivisie players
Eerste Divisie players
ADO Den Haag players
FC Dordrecht players
NAC Breda players
SC Cambuur players
De Graafschap players